The men's 56 kg powerlifting event at the 2012 Summer Paralympics was contested on 31 August at ExCeL London.

Records 
Prior to the competition, the existing world and Paralympic records were as follows.

Results 

Key: PR=Paralympic record; WR=World record; NMR=No marks recorded

References 

 

Men's 056 kg